Helen Dorothy Martin (July 23, 1909 – March 25, 2000) was an American actress of stage and television. Martin's career spanned over 60 years, appearing first on stage and later in film and television. Martin is best known for her roles as Wanda on the CBS sitcom Good Times (1974–1979) and as Pearl Shay on the NBC sitcom 227 (1985–1990).

Biography

Early life and education
Martin was raised in Nashville, Tennessee. She was an only child born to a family of musicians. Martin's parents wanted their daughter to become a concert pianist. At the urging of her parents, Martin attended Fisk University for a two year span before dropping out to embark on an acting career.
During the Great Depression, Martin supported herself as a domestic worker.

Career
After leaving college, Martin moved to Chicago, and New York City thereafter to study acting with the WPA Theater and the Rose McClendon Players. She was a founding member of the American Negro Theater in Harlem. Martin became a Broadway character actress for many decades, debuting in 'Orchids Preferred' in 1937 and thereafter Orson Welles's production of Native Son in 1941.

Martin appeared in a dozen Broadway shows, including Jean Genet's The Blacks, the musical Raisin from 1973 until 1975, Ossie Davis's Purlie Victorious (and later the musical version, which was called Purlie), The Amen Corner and Tennessee Williams's Period of Adjustment.

Martin became widely known later in life due to her roles in popular television series, which brought her a large audience. She had a recurring role as Wanda "Weeping Wanda" on the television series Good Times, and later as the neighbor Pearl Shay on the television sitcom 227, which lasted from 1985 until 1990. Martin also had a role on the short-lived sitcoms Baby, I'm Back (as mother in-law, Luzelle) and That's My Mama. Martin portrayed a variety of grandmothers in films: Hollywood Shuffle (1987), Don't Be a Menace to South Central While Drinking Your Juice in the Hood (1996), I Got the Hook Up (1998), House Party 2 (1991), and Mama Doll in Bulworth (1998).

While appearing on Late Night with Conan O'Brien to promote Don't Be a Menace, Martin sent host Conan O'Brien and the audience into a frenzy with her remarks, responding to a question about being cast as a pot-smoking grandmother in the film, "I love the reefer!", and that she would be a stripper had she not gone into acting, following the statement with a suggestive dance.

Death
Martin died of a heart attack on March 25, 2000 in Monterey, California, aged 90.

Filmography

 1955 The Phenix City Story as Helen Ward
 1961 Frontiers of Faith (TV series, 1 episode) as Unknown
 1969 J.T. (TV Movie) as Mrs. Hill
 1970 Cotton Comes to Harlem as Church Sister
 1970 Where's Poppa? as Second Job Applicant
 1971 The Anderson Tapes as Minor Role (uncredited)
 1973 Big Daddy (TV Movie) as Unknown
 1973-1974 Maude (TV Series, 2 episodes) as Stella
 1974 Death Wish as Alma Lee Brown
 1974-1979 Good Times (TV Series, 7 episodes) as Wanda
 1975 That's My Mama (TV Series, 6 episodes) as Laura
 1976-1979 What's Happening!! (TV Series) as Millie / Mrs. Lloyd
 1976-1977 Sanford and Son (TV Series) as Millie / Nurse / Church Sister #1 / Lady #1
 1977 Insight  (TV Series, 1 episode) as Bessie
 1977 Starsky and Hutch (TV Series, 2 episodes) as Nellie 'Dirty Nellie' / Vivian Fellers
 1978 Baby, I'm Back (TV Series, 13 episodes) as Luzelle Carter
 1978 A Hero Ain't Nothin' but a Sandwich as Mrs. Bell
 1978 Cindy (TV Movie) as Flower Lady
 1979 Lawman Without a Gun  (TV Movie) as Mrs. Cartwright
 1979 Dummy  (TV Movie) as Mrs. Harrod
 1979 Better Late Than Never (TV Movie) as Unknown
 1980 The Stockard Channing Show (TV Series, 1 episode) as Maid
 1980-1981 The White Shadow as Louise / Old Woman
 1981-1983 Hill Street Blues as Neighbor / Woman Onlooker
 1982 T.J. Hooker (TV Series,1 episode) as Mrs. Sears
 1982 Wacko as Harbinger's Mother
 1983 Alice (TV Series, 1 episode) as Customer
 1983 The Jeffersons (TV Series, 1 episode) as Alice
 1983 Deal of the Century as Baptist #3
 1984 Hardcastle and McCormick (TV Series, 1 episode) as Mrs. Prufrock
 1984 The Jerk, Too (TV Movie) as Grandma Johnson
 1984 St. Elsewhere (TV Series, 1 episode) as Elderly Lady
 1984 Repo Man as Mrs. Parks
 1984 Benson (TV Series) as Benson's Aunt Lil episode "the reunion"
 1985-1990 227 (TV Series, 116 episodes) as Pearl Shay
 1985 Amos (TV Movie) as Mrs. McKenzie
 1987 Hollywood Shuffle as Bobby's Grandmother
 1989 A Raisin in the Sun (TV Movie) as Mrs. Johnson
 1989 Full House (TV Series, 1 episode) as Shirley
 1989 Jackée (TV Series) as Pearl Shay
 1990 Night Angel as Sadie
 1990 The Flash (TV Series, 1 episode) as Sadie Grosso
 1991 A Rage in Harlem as Mrs. Canfield
 1991 Doc Hollywood as Maddie, Welcoming Committee
 1991 House Party 2 as Mrs. Deevers
 1993 The Pitch (Short) as Old Woman
 1994 Beverly Hills Cop III as Grandma
 1995 The Parent 'Hood (TV Series, 1 episode) as Ms. Morris
 1995 The Wayans Bros. (TV Series, 1 episode) as Mother Evans
 1996 Don't Be a Menace to South Central While Drinking Your Juice in the Hood as Loc Dog's Grandma
 1997 Kiss the Girls as Nana Cross
 1997 I'm Bout It (V) as Mrs. Alberta
 1998 The Jamie Foxx Show (TV Series, 1 episode) as Mother Superior
 1998 Since You've Been Gone (TV Movie) as Old Lady
 1998 Bulworth as Momma Doll
 1998 I Got the Hook Up (aka I Got the Hook-Up (USA: review title)) as Grandmother
 1999 At Face Value (Short) as Miss Ella
 2000 Something to Sing About (TV Movie) as Elderly woman (final film role)

Stage work
1937: Orchids Preferred .... Evy
1941: Native Son .... Vera Thomas
1945: Deep Are the Roots .... Honey Turner
1953: Take a Giant Step .... Poppy
1960: The Long Dream .... Maude Carter
1960: Period of Adjustment .... Susie
1960: The Blacks ....
1961: Purlie Victorious .... Missy Judson
1963: My Mother, My Father and Me .... Hannah
1965: The Amen Corner .... Sister Douglas
1967: Something Different .... Sarah Goldfine
1970: Purlie .... Idelia
1973: Raisin .... Mrs. Johnson

References

External links

1909 births
2000 deaths
Actresses from St. Louis
Place of birth missing
American television actresses
African-American actresses
American film actresses
20th-century African-American women singers
American musical theatre actresses
20th-century American actresses
20th-century American singers
20th-century American women singers